Bo & Gustavo Catilina are a Belgian film director couple. Their two debut feature films, that they produced simultaneously, are Direction Lourdes (2017) and Bonnie&Clyde Copycats (2017).

Their first animated short film: The Flight of the Humble Bee was selected for numerous film festivals, including the Wildlife Conservation film festival in New York City.

With Bonnie&Clyde Copycats they've filmed the first 'car chase with gunfire' ever in the historic center of Bruges.

References

Living people
Date of birth missing (living people)
Belgian film directors
Year of birth missing (living people)